Benjamin Tibbets Kemerer (December 9, 1874 – September 23, 1960) was an American Episcopalian bishop.

Born in Vernon Center, Minnesota, Kemerer was a salesman and advertising manager. He went to Hamline University from 1890 to 1894 and then received his doctorate in theology in 1931 from Seabury Theological Seminary. In 1904, Kemerer was ordained to the priesthood and then served in St. Louis, Missouri. From 1930 to 1933, Kemerer served as coadjutor bishop of the Episcopal Diocese of Duluth. He then served as bishop of the Episcopal Diocese from 1933 until 1944 when the diocese was reunited with the Episcopal Diocese of Minnesota. He then served as suffragan bishop of the Diocese of Minnesota from 1944 until his retirement in 1948.

Notes

1874 births
1960 deaths
People from Vernon Center, Minnesota
Hamline University alumni
Businesspeople from Minnesota
Episcopal bishops of Duluth